The 2013 Clare Senior Hurling Championship was the 118th staging of the Clare Senior Hurling Championship since its establishment in 1887.

Newmarket-on-Fergus are the defending champions.

Senior Championship Knockout Stages

Quarter-finals
 Top two teams from each Senior A Group plus both Senior B Finalists.

Semi-finals

County Final

Championship statistics

Miscellaneous
Sixmilebridge win their first title since 2002.

References

External links

Clare Senior Hurling Championship
Clare Senior Hurling Championship